Antrim 1844 Country House Hotel is a historic inn located in the heart of Taneytown, Carroll County, Maryland, United States. The Mansion is a -story Greek Revival style brick masonry house constructed in 1844. The property retains many of its outbuildings and is operated as a hotel and restaurant. In 2022 the hotel itself is currently a member of Historic Hotels of America, an official program of the National Trust for Historic Preservation.

The hotel was listed on the National Register of Historic Places in 1977 as Antrim.

History
In 1834, at the age of 22, Col. Andrew Ege married Margaret Ann McKaleb, daughter of Maj. John McKaleb, one of Taneytown's successful merchants. After the deaths of Margaret's only brother in 1841 and John McKaleb's death in January 1843, Margaret and Andrew inherited his 420-acre estate in Taneytown. Once settled, Andrew and Margaret began construction on Antrim in 1844, which involved Baltimore builder Benjamin Forrester, and sculptor William Henry Rinehart. The inn is named after his wife's family's ancestral home in County Antrim, Ireland.

On the lands, Ege operated a large slave plantation, raising 14 horses, 12 milk cows, and 18 other cattle, which produced 1,000 pounds of butter. He also produced 900 bushes of wheat, rye, corn, oats, potatoes, and hay on the acreage. After Ege went bankrupt, a local farmer bought the estate, whose descendants expanded the land holdings and continued operating it as a farm until the 1940s. The mansion was then only used as a summer home until Dort and Richard Mollett bought it in 1988.

Following the death of his wife in 1851, Andrew remarried and moved his family west to the border between Missouri and Kansas.

References

External links
, including photo in 1989, at Maryland Historical Trust
Antrim 1844 Country House Hotel

Houses on the National Register of Historic Places in Maryland
Houses in Carroll County, Maryland
Houses completed in 1844
Greek Revival houses in Maryland
Plantations in Maryland
Taneytown, Maryland
National Register of Historic Places in Carroll County, Maryland
Historic Hotels of America